The Deerfield Beach Elementary School is a historic school in Deerfield Beach, Florida. It is located at 651 Northeast 1st Street and is in the Broward County Public Schools school district. On April 16, 1990, it was added to the United States National Register of Historic Places.

Building
Designed by the architectural firm Thomas D. McLaughlin and Associates, and situated on land bought in 1925 by the Broward County Board of Public Instruction for $21,000 the school was built in 1926 and 1927 by the Alfred W. Kimmel Company of Pompano Beach for a cost of $55,000.

History
Despite being one of the country's oldest schools, the school's facilities are still in use. The first Old Deerfield School is also listed on the National Register of Historic Places. The property for the school was obtained by the Broward County Board of Public Instruction in an exchange with the city of Deerfield Beach for the old school property.

References

Further reading

External links

 at Broward County's list of NRHP sites.
 Florida Heritage Tourism Interactive Catalog

Schools in Broward County, Florida
Public elementary schools in Florida
National Register of Historic Places in Broward County, Florida
Deerfield Beach, Florida
Broward County Public Schools
1927 establishments in Florida
Educational institutions established in 1927